The Kid with the Broken Halo is a 1982 American made-for-television fantasy-comedy film starring Gary Coleman, Robert Guillaume, June Allyson, Mason Adams and Ray Walston about a wise-cracking "angel-in-training" (Coleman) who needs constant help from his frustrated heavenly teacher. It was directed by Leslie H. Martinson, written by George Kirgo and was originally broadcast April 5, 1982 on NBC.

Cast
 Gary Coleman ... Andy LeBeau
 Robert Guillaume ... Blake
 June Allyson ... Dorothea Powell
 Mason Adams... Harry Tannenbaum
 Ray Walston ... Michael
 John Pleshette ... Jeff McNulty
 Lani O'Grady ... Julie NcNulty
 Telma Hopkins ... Gail Desautel
 Kim Fields ... Teri Desautel
 Tammy Lauren ... Diana McNulty
 Keith Coogan ... Nick McNulty
 Georg Stanford Brown ... Rudy Desautel
 Corey Feldman ... Rafe
 Don Diamond ... Giuseppe

Animated series

The film's lead character, Andy LeBeau, was spun off into a Hanna-Barbera-produced animated series called The Gary Coleman Show which aired on NBC during the 1982–83 season. Coleman provided the voice of Andy, an apprentice angel dispatched back to Earth to earn his wings by helping others and who also dealt with an antagonist named Hornswoggle, a well-dressed demon with purple skin, black hair and a goatee.

See also
 List of films about angels

References

External links
 
 

1982 television films
1982 films
1980s fantasy comedy films
African-American comedy films
American fantasy comedy films
Films about angels
Films directed by Leslie H. Martinson
NBC network original films
Films adapted into television shows
1980s English-language films
1980s American films